Avilla is a town in Allen Township, Noble County, in the U.S. state of Indiana. The population was 2,401 at the 2010 census.

History
A post office has been in operation at Avilla since 1846. According to Ronald L. Baker, the town may be named after Ávila, Spain,  other sources indicated the name was given to represent the French word "villa," meaning a small town.

Among the oldest buildings is the St. James Hotel, which is now the St. James Restaurant. Today Avilla Motor Works has become one of the most well-known businesses in the city, serving many nearby cities.

Geography
Avilla is located at  (41.363977, -85.236524).

Demographics

2010 census
As of the 2010 census, there were 2,401 people, 916 households, and 593 families living in the town. The racial makeup of the town was 98.3% White, 0.7% African American, 0.2% Asian, 0.2% from other races, and 0.6% from two or more races. Hispanic or Latino of any race were 1.5% of the population.

There were 916 households, of which 37.0% had children under the age of 18 living with them, 45.5% were married couples living together, 12.1% had a female householder with no husband present, 7.1% had a male householder with no wife present, and 35.3% were non-families. 30.1% of all households were made up of individuals, and 11.2% had someone living alone who was 65 years of age or older. The average household size was 2.46 and the average family size was 3.04.

The median age in the town was 36.2 years. 27% of residents were under the age of 18; 8.9% were between the ages of 18 and 24; 26.4% were from 25 to 44; 20.4% were from 45 to 64; and 17.3% were 65 years of age or older. The gender makeup of the town was 46.5% male and 53.5% female.

2000 census
As of the 2000 census, there were 2,049 people, 780 households, and 520 families living in the town. The racial makeup of the town was 97.32% White, 0.20% Black, 0.15% Native American, 0.44% Asian, 0.24% from other races, and 1.66% from two or more races. Hispanic or Latino of any race were 1.02% of the population.

There were 780 households, out of which 35.4% had children under the age of 18 living with them, 53.6% were married couples living together, 8.6% had a female householder with no husband present, and 33.3% were non-families. 28.1% of all households were made up of individuals, and 11.0% had someone living alone who was 65 years of age or older. The average household size was 2.45 and the average family size was 2.98.
 
In the town, the population was spread out, with 26.4% under the age of 18, 8.6% from 18 to 24, 32.2% from 25 to 44, 15.4% from 45 to 64, and 17.5% who were 65 years of age or older. The median age was 33 years. For every 100 females, there were 92.6 males. For every 100 females age 18 and over, there were 88.9 males.

The median income for a household in the town was $42,014, and the median income for a family was $48,800. Males had a median income of $36,773 versus $22,250 for females. The per capita income for the town was $17,591.  About 3.0% of families and 5.7% of the population were below the poverty line, including 6.6% of those under the age of 18 and 4.2% of those 65 and older.

Newspapers
Our Hometown News and the News-Sun.

Education
Avilla has a public library, a branch of the Noble County Public Library.

References

Towns in Noble County, Indiana
Towns in Indiana